David Pramik (born November 20, 1990) is a grammy-nominated music producer & songwriter based in Los Angeles.

Career

David Pramik has written and produced songs for a number of artists, including Selena Gomez, Bebe Rexha, Logic, Rag’n’Bone Man, X Ambassadors, Machine Gun Kelly, Oliver Tree, LANY, I Prevail, Lauv, Nothing More, Vic Mensa, Illenium, JP Cooper, One OK Rock, Sublime with Rome, Hey Violet, MAX, Cemetery Sun, Chris Lane, and Molly Kate Kestner.

Pramik co-wrote and co-produced Nothing More's single ‘Go To War’ and ‘Home’ by Machine Gun Kelly feat. X Ambassadors & Bebe Rexha, which was the lead single off of "Bright: The Soundtrack".

Pramik was nominated for a Grammy Award for his work on Nothing More's single ‘Go To War,’ which hit #1 at US Rock Radio, #1 on the US Mainstream Rock Chart and was nominated for three Grammys (Best Rock Song, Best Rock Album, Best Rock Performance).

Pramik Co-wrote and Co-produced multiple songs on the Grammy-Nominated I Prevail album, Trauma, including the lead singles off the album "Bow Down" & "Breaking Down". 'Breaking Down' peaked at #2 on the Active Rock Radio Charts in mid-2019.  In November 2019, it was announced that the song 'Bow Down' had received a Grammy Nomination for Best Metal Performance.

In January 2020, Pramik Co-wrote and Produced Cut You Off by Selena Gomez.  He also frequently collaborates with Oliver Tree.

David's songs have gotten numerous sync and licensing placements, including trailers for 24: Legacy, War of the Planet of the Apes, & Just Mercy as well as commercials for Android (operating system), Altice USA, & Jeep.

He is signed to Prescription Songs Publishing, under the umbrella of Kobalt, and is an alumnus of Berklee College of Music.

Production and songwriting discography

References

Berklee College of Music alumni
Living people
1990 births
People from Santa Clarita, California
Record producers from California
Songwriters from California